Menfi is a comune (municipality) in the Province of Agrigento in the Italian region Sicily, located about  southwest of Palermo and about  northwest of Agrigento.

In 1910, a full third of the population of the town of Menfi had emigrated to the United States.

Main sights

A tower (Torre Federiciana), which is the remains of a medieval castle built by Frederick II of Hohenstaufen in 1238, perhaps over an Arab fortification.
Chiesa Madre ("Mother Church"), built in the 18th century but destroyed by an earthquake in 1968. It was later rebuilt.
Church of St. Joseph (1715).

The remains of an Iron Age prehistoric settlement were found in the 1980s outside of the town.

Twin towns
 Canelli, Italy, since 1997
 Chivilcoy, Argentina, since 1999
 Ettlingen, Germany, since 2004

Notable People 
Joe Masseria, former Boss of the Genovese Crime Family

References

External links

 ScopriMenfi, Menfi's Tourism web site
 Official website
 

Cities and towns in Sicily